Lakhdaria District is a district of Bouïra Province, Algeria.

Municipalities
The district is further divided into 6 municipalities:
Lakhdaria
Boukram 
Maala
Bouderbala
Zbarbar
Guerrouma

Notable people
Mohamed Aïchaoui, journalist, militant and martyr

References

Districts of Bouïra Province